Il Tramonto (The Sunset) is an oil on canvas landscape painting by Giorgione, created c. 1505–1508, now in the National Gallery, London, which bought it in 1961.

In the right background Saint George kills the dragon and Anthony the Great meditates in a cave, whilst Gottard lances Saint Roch's boil in the centre foreground. These sets of figures are divided by a river, as in the same artist's The Tempest. The present of Saint Roch suggests the work was painted in thanks for the end of the 1504 plague in the Veneto. The work shows influences from both Leonardo da Vinci and the Danube School.

References

Paintings by Giorgione
Paintings of Anthony the Great
Paintings of Saint George (martyr)
Paintings of Saint Roch
Collections of the National Gallery, London
Landscape paintings
1508 paintings
Horses in art
Paintings of dragons